The canton of Le Haut Dadou is an administrative division of the Tarn department, southern France. It was created at the French canton reorganisation which came into effect in March 2015. Its seat is in Réalmont.

It consists of the following communes:
 
Alban
Ambialet
Arifat
Bellegarde-Marsal
Curvalle
Fauch
Le Fraysse
Laboutarie
Lamillarié
Lombers
Massals
Miolles
Montredon-Labessonnié
Mont-Roc
Mouzieys-Teulet
Orban
Paulinet
Poulan-Pouzols
Rayssac
Réalmont
Saint-André
Sieurac
Teillet
Terre-de-Bancalié
Villefranche-d'Albigeois

References

Cantons of Tarn (department)